The Laguna Mountain Recreation Area is a park located in San Benito County, California, and administered by the Bureau of Land Management.

The recreation area encompasses  Laguna Mountain of the Diablo Range, and is adjacent to Hernandez Reservoir.

The area consists of somewhat rugged terrain with rolling hills covered in dense brush. The area's vegetation is characterized by classic chaparral habitat, oak forests, and grassy meadows. Laguna Creek flows through the area most of the year, accompanied by a series of scenic waterfalls in the Laguna Creek gorge.

The recreation area features two campgrounds and three trailheads, among other recreation opportunities.

See also
Parks in San Benito County, California
Bureau of Land Management areas in California

References

External links
BLM—Bureau of Land Management: Official Laguna Mountain Recreation Area website

Parks in San Benito County, California
Diablo Range
Bureau of Land Management areas in California